Ian Richards may refer to:

 Ian Richards (admiral) (1930–2022), Royal Australian Navy officer, Deputy Chief of Naval Staff 1983–84
 Ian Richards (racewalker) (born 1948), English race walker
 Ian Richards (English cricketer) (born 1957), English cricketer
 Ian Richards (South African cricketer) (born 1965), South African cricketer
 Ian Richards (judge) (born 1975), American judge
 Ian Richards (footballer) (born 1979), English footballer
 Ian Richards (diplomat) British diplomat, ambassador of the United Kingdom to Eritrea 2016–2019

See also
Ian Richardson (disambiguation)